Kerry Blewett (born 1 February 1986, in Penzance) is a Cornish life guard who gained the acclaim of 'India's first female lifeguard in the late 2000s. In 2009, she was also selected as part of the British Sprint canoeing squad.

References

British female canoeists
Living people
1986 births
Sportspeople from Penzance
Lifeguards